Madhapar is a village located in Kutch district in the state of Gujarat, India. It is one of the richest villages in India in terms of bank deposits. The village has around 7600 households and 2000 crore Indian rupee worth bank deposits.

History

Madhapar is one of the 18 villages established by the Mistris of Kutch. In the 12th century, many people of this community also known as Kutch Gurjar Kshatriyas moved into a village named Dhaneti and later settled between Anjar and Bhuj. Madhapar is named after Madha Kanji Solanki who had shifted from the Dhaneti village to Madhapar in the year 1473–1474 (VS 1529).  Madha Kanji was the third generation of Hemraj Hardas of Solanki dynasty of Gujarat, who moved from the Halar region to Dhaneti and then to Madhapar. This early Madhapar today is known as Juna Vaas (Old Residence). These warrior Kshatriyas later came to be known by Mistri mainly because of their occupation. These Mistris have founded the Juna Vaas and contributed a lot to the development of all early infrastructure, temples of the village and erection of other architects of Kutch.

The Patel Kanbi community moved into the village around 1576 AD (V.S. 1633). Navo Vaas (New Residence) was started in around 1857, by which time Madhapar had become congested and other communities like the Kanbis had also increased and prospered.
 
The village was not heavily affected by the 2001 Gujarat earthquake that had caused severe damage in the region. However, some of the century-old houses of Mistris in Juna Vaas (Old Residence) with unique architect were damaged in the earthquake of 26 January 2001.

Schools

The first government boys' school was started in 1884. Bhimji Devji Rathod of Mistri Community built and started the first girls' school in Madhapar in 1900. The first high school, Madhapar Saraswati Vidhyalay High School, was founded in 1968.

Present status
The town of Madhapar, with a population of more than ninety two thousand people, some 3 km from the main town of Bhuj in the province of Kutch (Gujarat).

In recent times, the town has become greener, with new lakes, check dams and deep bore artesian wells that provide fresh water all year round. It has new health centers, playing fields, parks and temples.

Geology

There are two large lakes in Madhapar. One is called Jagasagar and was built by Mistri railway contractor Jagamal Bhima Rathod around the year 1900; it is named after him. His brother, Karasan Bhima Rathod also built an artificial lake with steps near the Suralbhit Temple, which today is known as Karasan Bhimjee's Pond.
The other is called Meghrajji Lake, named after Meghrajji, the last ruler of the Cutch State.

Temples
Sanatan Thakor Mandir, Mahadev Temple, Barla Temple and Swaminarayan Temple (1949) are in Madhapar.

Kuldevi Temples of Momai Mata of Solanki, Rathods are also there.

As per records of the old Thakor Madir, Shiva Mandir and the noted Barla Temple were built by Mistri Mandan Jiwani Chauhan of the Mistri community around 1880–1890 from the monies he earned as railway contract works in Sindh

Yaksh Mandir or Jakh Bautera (72) Temple is the most popular temple of town, enshrining the 72 Yakshas or Jakh Botera folk deities of Jakh community.

Economy

Agriculture plays a large part in the region's prosperity, and most of the agricultural goods are exported to Mumbai. These primarily consist of corn, mangoes and sugarcane.

Many residents of Madhapar work abroad in the Africa, UK, USA, and Canada. But they prefer to save their money in India, which has made Madhapar one of the richest villages in terms of bank deposits worth over $200 crores. The village has earned a special name in India and is considered a barometer of NRI deposits.

The migrant population of Madhapar living outside India have huge love for their village and have formed community associations. In 1968, Kutch Madhapar Karyalay was formed in London to bind the UK Madhapar community together and maintain their cultural activities and traditions.

Gallery

References

Villages in Kutch district